Saint-Marc-le-Blanc is a commune in the Ille-et-Vilaine department in Brittany in northwestern France. On 1 January 2019, the former commune Baillé was merged into Saint-Marc-le-Blanc.

Geography

The adjacent communes are Saint-Brice-en-Coglès, Baillé, Le Tiercent, Chauvigné, and Tremblay.

Population
Inhabitants of Saint-Marc-le-Blanc are called marcblaisiens in French.

See also
Communes of the Ille-et-Vilaine department

References

External links

 Geography of Brittany
 The page of the commune on infobretagne.com

Mayors of Ille-et-Vilaine Association 

Communes of Ille-et-Vilaine

Communes nouvelles of Ille-et-Vilaine
Populated places established in 2019
2019 establishments in France